St Catherine's Hospital may refer to:

In the United Kingdom
St Catherine's Health Centre, Birkenhead, formerly named St Catherine's Hospital.
St. Catherine's Hospital, Rochester
St Catherine's Hospital, Doncaster